= 2003 World Championships in Athletics qualification standards =

Qualifying standards for the 2003 World Championships in Athletics can be found here - Entry standards World Championships Paris 2003
